XTR is an American film production company founded in 2019 by Bryn Mooser. The company is best known for producing films Mucho Mucho Amor: The Legend of Walter Mercado (2020), Bloody Nose, Empty Pockets (2020), The Fight (2020), 76 Days (2020), and Ascension (2021).

History
In September 2019, it was announced Bryn Mooser had launched XTR a film and television production company specializing in documentaries. Apart from financing and producing films, XTR through XTR Film Society a non-profit division of the company, that offers grants to filmmakers making documentaries with less commercial value.

In October 2020, it was announced Tony Hsieh had invested $17.5 million dollars in the company, which would be used to finance and produce films, and offer grants to filmmakers.

Documentary+, XTR's free streaming platform for nonfiction film and TV, was launched in January 2021. 

In April 2022, the company's first television series They Call Me Magic was released on Apple TV+.

In October 2022, XTR Studios opened a 35,000-square-foot production facility and headquarters in Echo Park.

Filmography

2020s

Upcoming

References

External links
 

American companies established in 2019
Film production companies of the United States
Entertainment companies established in 2019
American independent film studios